Great Old Amusement Parks is a 1999 PBS television documentary VHS DVD produced by Rick Sebak of WQED Pittsburgh. It aired on PBS on July 21, 1999.

Vintage surviving "Traditional" amusement parks are presented here with historic references to their origins. Unique old rides for each park are profiled such as the oldest surviving roller coaster, the only surviving Noah's Ark walk-through attraction.  Most parks are family owned and their families are interviewed along with each park's attendees. Subjects include Connecticut's Lake Compounce, California's Santa Cruz Beach Boardwalk, Whalom Park in Massachusetts, Pennsylvania's Idlewild Park and StoryBook Forest, Kennywood's Thunderbolt, Deno's Wonder Wheel at Coney Island, and San Diego's Giant Dipper where a local radio station held a Roller Coaster Riding Contest.

Not covered here are vintage "traditional" amusement parks no longer with us.  Being produced in 1999, this has not been updated to indicate if these are still around (most are).

Rick Sebak usually produced wholesome local interest documentaries for the Pittsburgh area with a heavy focus on food. This is one of 4 documentaries he produced of that has been shown throughout the PBS network.

List of amusement parks:
 Idlewild and Soak Zone- Ligonier, Pennsylvania.
 Cedar Point– Sandusky, Ohio.
 Astroland– New York, New York.
 Deno's Wonder Wheel Amusement Park, New York.
 Santa Cruz Beach Boardwalk– Santa Cruz, California.
 Lake Compounce– Bristol, Connecticut.
 Kennywood– West Mifflin, Pennsylvania.
 Rye's Playland- Rye, New York.
 Oaks Amusement Park– Portland, Oregon.
 Mission Beach Roller Coaster– San Diego, California.
 Lake Winnepesaukah– Lakeview, Georgia.
 Whalom Park– Lunenburg, Massachusetts.
 Holiday World & Splashin' Safari– Santa Claus, Indiana.
 Lakeside Amusement Park– Lakeside, Colorado.
 Lakemont Park– Altoona, Pennsylvania.

Not covered here are defunct parks.
 West View Park, Olympia Park, Rainbow Gardens, Luna Park, Playground By The Sea.

American documentary television films
Amusement parks in the United States
Films set in amusement parks